Lee Ying Ying (李盈盈, born 25 October 1997) is a Malaysian badminton player. Lee started playing badminton at aged 8 in Ipoh. She made her debut in the international tournament in 2015, and at the same year she was selected to join the national team. She was the silver medalist at the 2015 World Junior Championships, and won her first senior international tournament at the 2016 Romanian International.

Achievements

BWF World Junior Championships 
Girls' singles

BWF International Challenge/Series 
Women's singles

  BWF International Challenge tournament
  BWF International Series tournament
  BWF Future Series tournament

References

External links 
 

1997 births
Living people
People from Ipoh
Malaysian sportspeople of Chinese descent
Malaysian female badminton players
Badminton players at the 2014 Summer Youth Olympics
Competitors at the 2017 Southeast Asian Games
Competitors at the 2019 Southeast Asian Games
Southeast Asian Games silver medalists for Malaysia
Southeast Asian Games bronze medalists for Malaysia
Southeast Asian Games medalists in badminton